Eelderwolde is a village in the Dutch province of Drenthe. It is a part of the municipality of Tynaarlo, and lies about 5 km south of Groningen.

History 
The village was first mentioned in 1442 as "to Eelderwolde", and means "woods of Eelde".

Eelderwolde was home to 34 people in 1840. In 1973, a recreation area is developed near Eelderwolde. It was expanded in 1983, and in 1987, a Scandinavian village with sauna was added. Since 2006, the neighbourhood Ter Borch is being developed with will ultimately consists of 1,250 houses.

References

Populated places in Drenthe
Tynaarlo